Ebrahim (Abe) H. Mamdani (1 June 1942 – 22 January 2010) was a mathematician, computer scientist, electrical engineer and artificial intelligence researcher. He worked at the Imperial College London.

Life 
Abe Mamdani was born in Tanzania in June 1942. He was educated in India and in 1966 he went to the UK.

He obtained his PhD at Queen Mary College, University of London. After that he joined its Electrical Engineering Department

In 1975 he introduced a new method of fuzzy inference systems, which was called 'Mamdani-Type Fuzzy Inference'. Mamdani-Type Fuzzy Inference  have elements like human instincts, working under the rules of linguistics, and has a fuzzy algorithm that provides an approximation to enter  mathematical analysis.

In July 1995, he moved from Queen Mary College to Imperial College London.

Awards and honors 
Abe Mamdani was an Emeritus Professor at Imperial College London. He received the "European Fuzzy Pioneer Award" from the European Society for Fuzzy Logic and Technology (EUSFLAT) in 1999, and the "Fuzzy Systems Pioneer Award" from the IEEE Computational Intelligence Society in 2003. He was also a Fellow of IEEE, IFSA, and of the Royal Academy of Engineering and the IEE in the UK.

References 

Control theorists
Fellow Members of the IEEE
British computer scientists
1942 births
2010 deaths
Artificial intelligence researchers
British logicians
20th-century British mathematicians
Systems scientists
Academics of Imperial College London
Academics of the University of London
Alumni of Queen Mary University of London
Fellows of the Royal Academy of Engineering
Fellows of the Institution of Electrical Engineers
Tanzanian Ismailis
British Ismailis